Leon Seidel (born November 22, 1996) is a German actor. Is known for playing the role of Huckleberry Finn in the German film of 2011 .

Life and career
Seidel was born in Cologne. His talent for acting, says Seidel, he had inherited from his father, who works in a cabaret group. Would be 2008, then 11-year-old made his debut in Kaspar Heidelbach's movie Berlin '36 and completed several appearances in the TV comedy Stromberg, where he played the son of Jennifer Schirrmann (Milena Thirty) and almost the stepson of the infamous bosses become.

It was followed by a supporting role in the sports comedy Teufelskicker by Granz Henman, who came in 2010 in the cinemas and made known on the side of stars such as Armin Rohde and Benno Furmann a wider cinema audience the young actor. Since October 2011, the young actor is seen in his first major role in John Schmid's German-Polish drama Winter's Daughter.

Only a month later he work for Hermine Huntgeburth's , in which the young actor take on the role of the orphan Huckleberry Finn and acting on the side of Louis Hofmann who play the title character. In 2012 took on the lead role in the sequel .

In addition to his acting work Leon Seidel can also be heard as a speaker.

Filmography

Awards and nominations

References

External links
 

1996 births
German male child actors
Living people
German male television actors
German male film actors